Justin T. Bowler (born February 12, 1974) is an American actor, writer, and producer. He is best known for his role as the Disney character "Swampy" on Where's My Water?: Swampy's Underground Adventures. He wrote, executive produced and starred in the short film Touch, which won several film festival awards.

Career
In 2007, Justin T. Bowler starred in, co-wrote, co-produced the feature film "Pool Party".

In 2010, Justin became a contributing writer, and reviewer for the comedic entertainment news site "The Movie Guys".

In March, 2011, he wrote and executive produced the award winning short film, Touch. The film was accepted to over 20 domestic and international film festivals and won 5 awards.

In the summer of 2011, Justin sang three tracks on the Wii video game The Smurfs Dance Party.

In the fall of 2011, Justin provided the voices of Swampy, and his nemesis, Cranky, in the Disney Interactive Studios application Where's My Water?.

In 2012-2013, he reprised the voices of Swampy and Cranky, in addition to the rest of the male voices, in the animated Disney series Where's My Water?: Swampy's Underground Adventures.

Filmography
Actor

Video game

Producer

References

External links

1974 births
Living people
American male actors